Francis Joseph Boyle (June 14, 1927 – September 11, 2006) was a United States district judge of the United States District Court for the District of Rhode Island.

Education and career

Born in Providence, Rhode Island, Boyle was in the United States Navy from 1945 to 1946. He attended Providence College and the University of Michigan-Ann Arbor. He received a Juris Doctor from Boston College Law School in 1952 and was in private practice in Pawtucket, Rhode Island in 1953, and then in Newport, Rhode Island until 1977.

Federal judicial service

On May 2, 1977, Boyle was nominated by President Jimmy Carter to a seat on the United States District Court for the District of Rhode Island vacated by Judge Edward William Day. Boyle was confirmed by the United States Senate on June 30, 1977, and received his commission on July 1, 1977. He served as Chief Judge from 1982 to 1992, assuming senior status on December 1, 1992. Boyle served in that capacity until his death, on September 11, 2006, in Newport.

References

Sources
 
Judges of the United States (1983) 

1927 births
2006 deaths
Boston College Law School alumni
Judges of the United States District Court for the District of Rhode Island
United States district court judges appointed by Jimmy Carter
20th-century American judges
United States Navy sailors
Rhode Island lawyers
21st-century American judges
20th-century American lawyers
United States Navy personnel of World War II
University of Michigan alumni
Providence College alumni